Zakir may refer to:

People
 Zakir Hasan (cricketer, born 1972), a Bangladeshi cricketer
 Zakir Hasan (cricketer, born 1998), a Bangladeshi cricketer
 Zakir Hossain, Bangladeshi cricketer
 Zakir Hussain (actor), Indian film actor
 Zakir Hussain (politician), Indian politician
 Zakir Hussain (musician), Indian tabla player
 Zakir Hussain Gesawat, Politician from Rajasthan
 Zakir Khan, Pakistani cricketer
 Zakir Qureshi, Pakistani chef, host, hotelier 
 Zakir Naik, Indian Muslim preacher
 Zakir Sabirov, Tajikistani artist
 Abdul Qayyum Zakir also known as Abdullah Gulam Rasoul, Afghan Taliban leader
 Gasim bey Zakir, Azer

Places
 Zakir, East Azerbaijan, a village in East Azerbaijan Province, Iran
 Zakir, Zanjan, a village in Zanjan Province, Iran

Other 

 A fictional planet and the alien race that lives there in Another Life (2019 TV series)

See also
 Dhakir